Praja Parishad Jammu and Kashmir (Jammu and Kashmir Popular Association) was a political party in the Indian state of Jammu and Kashmir. PP was floated by dissidents of the Bharatiya Janata Party in January 2005. The name is taken from the Jammu Praja Parishad, which fought against the special status of J&K (Article 370 of the Indian Constitution). The Praja Parishad had merged with the Bharatiya Jana Sangh in 1963.

The new party was led by Chandermohan Sharma. The party worked for autonomy for the Jammu region.

Political parties in Jammu and Kashmir
Bharatiya Janata Party breakaway groups
2005 establishments in Jammu and Kashmir
Political parties established in 2005